Vagma is a town in the Méguet Department of Ganzourgou Province in central Burkina Faso. The town has a population of 1,213.

References

Populated places in the Plateau-Central Region
Ganzourgou Province